Placht is a surname. Notable people with the surname include:

 Elias Placht (1690–unknown), Czech-Austrian violin maker and founder of Cheb Violin Making School
 Johann Baptist Placht, 19th-century Austrian fraudster
 Otto Placht (born 1962), Czech artist
 Richard Placht, designer of the Wound Medal (Austria-Hungary)

See also